My Jackhammer is the debut album from the Benevento/Russo Duo, released in 2003 under their own production.

Track listing
"Raindrops Whisper Words" - 9:21
"Sabia" - 7:00
"Improv I" - 12:32
"Seeup, Seedown" - 4:22
"Improv II" - 10:11
"My Jackhammer" - 16:38
"Curvedspace" - 6:01
"Impact" - 6:29
"Redbull" - 7:00

Credits
Marco Benevento - organs, synthesizers, keyboards
Joe Russo - drums, percussion

2003 debut albums
Benevento/Russo Duo albums